The Guadeloupe Passage is a strait in the Caribbean. It separates Guadeloupe from Montserrat and from Antigua and Barbuda.

See also
 1996 France–United Kingdom Maritime Delimitation Agreements
 Anguilla Channel

References

Straits of the Caribbean
Straits of Guadeloupe
Landforms of Antigua and Barbuda
Antigua and Barbuda–Guadeloupe border
Guadeloupe–Montserrat border
International straits